The Vodacom Origins of Golf is a series of pro-am golf tournaments in South Africa. The series began in 2004 and forms part of the winter swing of the Southern Africa-based Sunshine Tour.

2004–05 season

2005–06 season

2006–07 season

2007 season

2008 season

2009 season

2010 season

2011 season

2012 season

2013 season

2014 season

2015 season

2016–17 season

2017–18 season

2018–19 season

2019–20 season

2020–21 season
No tournaments took place due to the COVID-19 pandemic.

2021–22 season

2022–23 season

Notes

References

External links

Sunshine Tour

Golf tournaments in South Africa
Sunshine Tour events